Piero Vegnuti (born 1 April 1942) is an Italian former bobsledder. He competed in the four man event at the 1976 Winter Olympics.

References

External links
 

1942 births
Living people
Italian male bobsledders
Olympic bobsledders of Italy
Bobsledders at the 1976 Winter Olympics
People from Gavorrano
Sportspeople from the Province of Grosseto